PC Today (Later Cyber Trend) was a monthly mobile computing and technology computer magazine published by Sandhills Publishing Company in Lincoln, Nebraska, US.

History and profile
The article and editorial content focused primarily around mobile and wireless technologies, notebooks, mobile phones, PDAs, Windows, and office and home software. The magazine was renamed CyberTrend in 2014, which was distributed to business-class hotels, airline clubs, and fixed-base operators. The magazine also included classified advertising. The magazine ceased publication in July 2017.

References

External links
 
 Publisher's website

Monthly magazines published in the United States
Defunct computer magazines published in the United States
Home computer magazines
Magazines with year of establishment missing
Magazines disestablished in 2017
Magazines published in Nebraska
Mass media in Lincoln, Nebraska